Statira Elizabeth Frame (15 September 1858 – 29 November 1935) was a Canadian painter, known for her innovative use of color.

Biography
Statira Elizabeth Wells was born in 1858 in Granby, Lower Canada. She moved to Vancouver after her marriage to William Frame, a bookkeeper for the Hastings Saw Mill Store in Vancouver.

Frame attended some art classes at Vancouver Night School. In 1909 she began to exhibit her work with the Studio Club. Frame was an acquaintance of Emily Carr and was introduce to Post-impressionistic concepts by Carr in 1912.

In 1918 Frame submitted some canvases to the American Ashcan School's Robert Henri for review. She received encouraging feedback from Henri, particularly regarding her use of color. Shortly thereafter Frame traveled to California for several months to study with the American Impressionist Armin Hansen.

In the 1920s Frame exhibited her work at the British Columbia Society of Fine Arts and the Vancouver Sketch Club. Frame became a prominent figure in the Vancouver art scene, particularly at the newly formed Palette and Chisel Club. She continued to exhibit in the Vancouver area in the 1930s.

Frame died in 1935 in Vancouver.

A posthumous exhibition of her work was held at Vancouver Art Gallery in April 1936.

References

External links
 Statira Elizabeth Frame images on Invaluable Art

1858 births
1935 deaths
19th-century Canadian women artists
20th-century Canadian women artists
19th-century Canadian artists
20th-century Canadian artists
Canadian women painters
19th-century Canadian painters
20th-century Canadian painters